The 2017–18 FA Trophy is the 49th season of the FA Trophy, an annual football competition for teams at levels 5-8 of the English National League System.

Calendar
The calendar for the 2017–18 FA Trophy, as announced by The Football Association.

Preliminary round

First Round Qualifying
A total of 144 teams took part in this stage of the competition including 64 winners from the preliminary round, 72 teams from Level 7 of English football and eight teams from level 8, who get a bye in the previous round.

Second Round Qualifying

Third Round Qualifying
A total of 80 teams took part in this stage of the competition, all winners from the second round qualifying and 44 clubs from Level 6 of English football.

First round proper
A total of 64 teams took part in this stage of the competition, all winners from the third round qualifying and the clubs from Level 5 of English football.

Second round proper

Third round proper

Fourth round proper

Semi-finals
Semi final fixtures are due to be played on 17 March and 24 March 2018, with the second leg going to extra time and penalties if required.

First leg
{{footballbox
|date=17 March 2018
|time=15:00
|team1=Brackley Town (6)
|goals1= Gudger 
|score= 1–0
|report=
|team2=Wealdstone' (6)
|goals2= 
|stadium= St. James Park, Brackley
|attendance= 1,250
|referee= Charles Breakspear
}}

Second legBrackley Town won 3–0 on aggregateBromley won 4-3 on aggregate''

Final

References

FA Trophy seasons
England
FA Trophy